Andhika Ramadhani (born 5 January 1999) is an Indonesian professional footballer who plays as a goalkeeper for Liga 1 club Persebaya Surabaya.

Club career

Persebaya Surabaya
He was signed for Persebaya Surabaya to play in Liga 1 in the 2021 season. Andhika made his professional debut on 3 October 2021 in a match against PSIS Semarang at the Wibawa Mukti Stadium, Cikarang.

Career statistics

Club

Notes

Honours

Club 
Persebaya Surabaya U-20
 Elite Pro Academy U-20: 2019

References

External links
 Andhika Ramadhani at Soccerway
 Andhika Ramadhani at Liga Indonesia

1999 births
Living people
Sportspeople from Surabaya
Sportspeople from East Java
Indonesian footballers
Liga 1 (Indonesia) players
Persebaya Surabaya players
Association football goalkeepers